Scincella formosensis, also known as Van Denburgh's ground skink, is a species of skink endemic to Taiwan.

References

Scincella
Reptiles of Taiwan
Endemic fauna of Taiwan
Reptiles described in 1912
Taxa named by John Van Denburgh